Federico Matías Falcone (born 21 February 1990 in Rosario, Santa Fe) is an Argentine professional footballer who plays for Maltese club Valletta as a centre forward.

External links

1990 births
Living people
Footballers from Rosario, Santa Fe
Argentine footballers
Association football forwards
Argentine Primera División players
Newell's Old Boys footballers
Chilean Primera División players
Primera B de Chile players
Deportes La Serena footballers
C.D. Huachipato footballers
A.C. Barnechea footballers
Rangers de Talca footballers
Maltese Premier League players
Valletta F.C. players
Malaysia Super League players
Terengganu FC players
Primeira Liga players
C.D. Aves players
Boavista F.C. players
Birkirkara F.C. players
Argentine expatriate footballers
Expatriate footballers in Chile
Expatriate footballers in Malta
Expatriate footballers in Malaysia
Expatriate footballers in Portugal
Argentine expatriate sportspeople in Chile
Argentine expatriate sportspeople in Malta
Argentine expatriate sportspeople in Portugal